Bandimere Speedway, also known in the NHRA as Thunder Mountain, is a quarter-mile dragstrip located just outside Morrison, Colorado and Lakewood, Colorado. It opened in 1958 and hosts the NHRA's Dodge//SRT Mile-High Nationals.  The facility has a seating capacity of 23,500 spectators.

History
In 1958, John Bandimere Sr. purchased a parcel of land on the west side of Denver nestled up against the Hogback leading up to the Rocky Mountains. He and his family began the process of constructing a small but efficient drag strip that was to be used to augment their auto parts business. It also was the fulfillment of a dream of John Sr.'s to provide a safe environment for young people to learn about cars and race them off the streets.

In 1988 the Bandimere family made the decision to undergo a much-needed $4 million improvement project, which included a year sabbatical on the national event circuit. The many facility improvements allowed for diversity of events, more spectator seating, better pit areas for race vehicles, improved spectator parking and access to all areas of the facility, and an unsurpassed venue for sponsor involvement with improved sign visibility. The ability to host larger spectator events added a tremendous amount of exposure opportunities for the facility and its sponsors. Seating capacity of the grandstands was increased from approximately 8,000 to over 23,500.

Now, nearly 50 years later, the only thing at Bandimere Speedway that has not changed is the facility's location. Nearly every original building has been replaced including the original spark plug-replica timing tower and the event schedule has grown nearly 10 times its original size to host a variety of specialty events, including the NHRA Mello Yello Mopar Mile-High Nationals.

"This speedway was the fulfillment of a life-long dream of dad and mom's," relates John Bandimere, Jr., track president. "It gives me great joy to know that through the efforts and support of many dedicated people over the years, we are enjoying over 45 years as a successful full-time racing facility and look forward to many more years in the business."

The track has several quirks that make it unique within the NHRA's schedule of events. First, and foremost, is the altitude. At over 5,000 feet above sea-level, the air is much thinner than any of its sea-level counterparts, which translates out to less air being pushed over the rear wings, and a loss of downforce, the thinner air also slows the cars down dramatically, a 330 mph run on any other track would barely top 320 at Bandimere, while a sub-4 second run would be over the 4 second mark.

The NHRA also adjusts the indices in their bracket categories, typically by six tenths.  Super Comp runs to 9.50, Super Gas to 10.50, and Super Street is run to 11.50 seconds.  All bracket racing-based classes are also reindexed because of altitude.

The track is also the only NHRA sanctioned track with a downhill staging area, and uphill shut down strip. The latter being a substantial safety measure.

External links
Official Site

NHRA Division 5 drag racing venues
Motorsport venues in Colorado
Tourist attractions in Jefferson County, Colorado
Buildings and structures in Jefferson County, Colorado